HNLMS Rigel was a multi-purpose steamship of the Government Navy that could also be used as minelayer and as yacht for the Governor-general of the Dutch East Indies. The ship was militarized in 1939 and taken into service of the Royal Netherlands Navy, where it served as minelayer between 1939 and 1942.

Design and construction 
Rigel was built in the Netherlands at the Nederlandsche Dok Maatschappij. The ship was laid down on 3 March 1930, launched on 7 March 1931 and commissioned into the Government Navy on 6 November 1931. The costs of building the ship was estimated to be 1.080.000 Dutch guilders, which was considered to be quite low for this type of ship.

The ship was equipped with a double set of rails on her deck that could carry a total of 150 mines. After being militarized in 1939 Rigel also got equipped with a ASDIC installation between 1940 and 1941.

Service history 
In April 1938 Rigel towed the hydrographic survey vessel Hydrograaf to Soerabaja after it had lost a propeller.

Second World War
Between 1939 and 1942 Rigel laid down mines in the waters of the Dutch East Indies. Starting in August 1939 the ship was made ready to mine the Westervaarwater near Soerabaja. In December 1941 it mined the access waters to Tandjong Priok. A few months later, in February 1942, Rigel laid down mines together with the HNLMS Krakatau at the coast of Madoera.

On 2 March 1942 Rigel was scuttled by its crew and used as blockship at the northern port entrance of Tandjong Priok.

In March 1944 the ship was lifted and partly restored by the Japanese. After Japan surrendered in 1945 the ship was found and handed over to the Dienst van Scheepsvaart (DvS).

In 1951 the ship was transferred to the Indonesian Navy.

Notes

Citations

References

Ships of the Government Navy
Minelayers of the Royal Netherlands Navy
Ships built in Amsterdam
1931 ships